Maurice Joncas (26 June 1936 – 13 June 2021) was a Canadian writer.

Biography
In 1968, Joncas began participating in numerous shows as a director, actor, and producer. The following year, he was a founding member of the Théâtre de l'Astran de Gaspé. A multidisciplinary artist known throughout the Gaspé Peninsula, he also practiced singing and painting. He made a career as a secondary school French teacher and retired in 1996.

Maurice Joncas died in Gaspé on 13 June 2021 at the age of 84.

Novels
La chevauchée des pèlerins : Entre la mer et l'exil (2001)
La chevauchée des pèlerins : La route des rêves (2002)
La chevauchée des pèlerins : Échec et mat (2004)
Le petit garçon qui cherchait son âme (2006)
Le dernier repas (2008)

Poetry
D'or... de sang... de bronze... (1991)
Images et mirages - écrits de l'anse (1993)
Eaux-delà - vingt-six chants d'amour en prose (1997)
Hyperborée (1999)
L'espérance retrouvée (1999)
L'oiseau couché sur son aile (2000)
Cantilènes et chants de mer (2005)

Stories
Chroniques d'enfance - nouveaux écrits de l'anse (1996)
Le vieil homme de la colline (2006)

Distinctions
Citation Chorale de l'Alliance des chorales du Québec (1988)
Prix Mérite Culturel Gaspésien (1988)
Prix Gasp'Art Culture (1994)
Médaille d'argent de l'Ordre du Mérite octroyé par la Fédération des Commissions scolaires du Québec (1996)

References

1936 births
2021 deaths
French Quebecers
20th-century Canadian novelists
Canadian theatre directors
People from Gaspésie–Îles-de-la-Madeleine
20th-century Canadian poets
20th-century Canadian short story writers
20th-century Canadian male writers
21st-century Canadian novelists
21st-century Canadian poets
21st-century Canadian short story writers
21st-century Canadian male writers
Canadian male novelists
Canadian male poets
Canadian male short story writers
Canadian novelists in French
Canadian poets in French
Canadian short story writers in French
Writers from Quebec